Chief mechanical engineers of the Western Australian Government Railways

 Thomas Forth Rotheram (1900-1903)
 Edward S. Hume (1904-1920)
 Ernest A. Evans (1920-1929)
 John W. R. Broadfoot (1929-1939)
 Frederick Mills (1940-1949)
 Tom Marsland (?-?)
 Charles Clarke (?-?)
 William Charles Blakeney-Britter  (?-?)

See also
 Western Australian Government Railways
 Rail transport in Western Australia

References
 Bertola, P.; Oliver, B. [Eds.] (2006). The Workshops: A History of the Midland Government Railway Workshops. Perth: University of Western Australia Press.

 
 
Railways
Western Australian Government Railways
History of rail transport in Western Australia